Lars Tofte may refer to:

 Lars Løberg Tofte, Norwegian rock-band member
 Valdemar Tofte (1832–1907), Danish violinist